James Kotecki (born October 23, 1985 in Syracuse, New York) is an American video blogger, online commentator, and self-described "political geek" who turned into a YouTube celebrity during the United States presidential election in 2008.

Education and Rise to Fame 

Kotecki graduated from Raleigh Charter High School, then magna cum laude from Georgetown University in May 2007 with the degree of Bachelor of Science in Foreign Service.

As a senior student at Georgetown, Kotecki spent his spare time in his dormitory, creating videos critiquing the 2008 presidential campaign candidates, and subsequently posting them on YouTube.

His witty and slightly cynical remarks and occasional rapping and playing the guitar in his videos had caught the attention of many people including politicians who agreed to appear in his dormitory for an interview; namely, Mike Gravel, former Democratic United States Senator from Alaska and a candidate in the 2008 presidential election, and Ron Paul, Republican Congressman for the State of Texas. Kotecki was also able to interview Democratic presidential candidate Dennis Kucinich.

Kotecki's video commentaries also attracted The Politico and offered him full-time employment as a video blogger. At The Politico, Kotecki wrote, produced and hosted his own online video series called KoteckiTV.

James Kotecki now does public policy research and analysis for The Cypress Group.

References

External links
Website of James Kotecki
Twitter page of James Kotecki
first Youtube channel of James Kotecki
second Youtube channel of James Kotecki
Video Blog of James Kotecki at Politico
Ron Paul Interview With James Kotecki

Living people
1985 births
American male bloggers
American bloggers
Writers from Syracuse, New York